= Pictures from the Surface of the Earth =

Photo book by Wim Wenders

- Author: Wim Wenders
- Genre: Photography
- Publisher: Schirmer/Mosel Verlag
- Publication date: 2001
- Publication place: Germany
- Pages: 136

Pictures from the Surface of the Earth (also published as Pictures of the Surface of the Earth) is a photography book by German filmmaker and photographer Wim Wenders, first published in 2001. The book was made from the catalogue of an exhibition that first took place in Munich and was originally published by Schirmer/Mosel Verlag, in 2001. The same exhibition would be repeated in several different places the following years.

== Description ==
The book was the result of several travels that Wenders took around the world during 20 years, most when he was directing films and visiting different countries, including Germany, Cuba, the United States, Israel, Japan and Australia, which he documented in his photographic work.

The human presence is usually absent from this body of work, which explains the book's title. They usually depict desertic landscapes, cityscapes, and architecture in the countries visited, and often serve as a background or as a complement for the films that Wenders was directing. The filmmaker also visited New York, shortly after the September 11 events, in November 2001, where he photographed Ground Zero, and the pictures taken then also appear in the book.
